Jameel McCline (born May 20, 1970) is an American former professional boxer. He challenged for the world heavyweight title on an unprecedented four occasions, losing all four attempts to Wladimir Klitschko, Chris Byrd, Nikolai Valuev and Samuel Peter. Despite never winning a world title, McCline did defeat former champions and top contenders in Michael Grant, Lance Whitaker, Al Cole, Cedric Boswell and Shannon Briggs. McCline retired in 2012 at the age of 42.

Championship titles held
 WBC Continental Americas Heavyweight Champion (2001)
 WBO-NABO Heavyweight Champion (2006)

Life before boxing
McCline grew up in Harlem, New York City, living in group homes, foster homes, and orphanages where he learned to live independently. Graduating from Comsewogue High School in Port Jefferson Station, New York, McCline spent five years in prison for gun running prior to becoming a professional fighter.

Professional career
Starting at the late age of 25 years and having no amateur experience, McCline took straight to the pro ranks taken part in four world Heavyweight title clashes with Chris Byrd, Wladimir Klitschko, Nikolai Valuev and Samuel Peter, losing all four times. Uniquely, each of these title bouts was for a different version of the world title. He has captured several wins against notable fighters, including Alfred Cole, Michael Grant, Lance Whitaker, Shannon Briggs, Charles Shufford, Cedric Boswell, but has been unable to replicate these performances in title fight situations, although the loss to Chris Byrd was by only one point in a very controversial split decision. Also losing a championship fight in which he had the champion (Sam Peter) down three times during the fight. In addition to the aforementioned title fight losses, he has lost to Greg Pickrom, Calvin Brock and was upset by the underdog Zuri Lawrence in 2005.  After which, he went on a six fight win streak that led him back to a World Title fight yet another two times.

On January 20, 2007 McCline challenged WBA heavyweight title holder Nikolai Valuev, in what was the first ever heavyweight title fight on Swiss soil. The fight was also reportedly the "biggest" championship fight in history, with the two fighters having a combined weight of approximately 600 pounds (270 kilograms) on fight night. Valuev was declared the winner by TKO when McCline suffered a patellar tendon rupture of his left knee at the end of the third round while throwing a punch and was unable to continue. At the time of the stoppage McCline was behind on only 1 of the judges scorecards.

McCline was most recently set to face Vitali Klitschko, in the latter's first fight back since retiring from the ring in 2005, but due to an injury Klitschko was forced to pull out, and instead McCline fought Samuel Peter on 6 October 2007 for Peter's WBC Interim title. Despite managing to put Peter on the canvas 3 times in the early rounds of the fight (the first knockdowns of Peter's career) McCline would go on to lose to a controversial unanimous decision on the judges scorecards.

On March 8, 2008 McCline faced former two-time WBA heavyweight title holder John Ruiz in Mexico. McCline lost a unanimous decision in a 12-round scheduled bout.

McCline defeated Mike Mollo by unanimous decision on November 7, 2008.

He fought Chris Arreola on April 11, 2009 on the undercard of the Paul Williams vs. Winky Wright bout but lost the fight by 4th-round knockout.

He made a comeback on December 3, 2011, where he defeated Dennis McKinney by TKO in the 4th round. The venue for the fight was Greensboro Coliseum, Greensboro, North Carolina.

Professional boxing record

|-
| align="center" style="border-style: none none solid solid; background: #e3e3e3"|Result
| align="center" style="border-style: none none solid solid; background: #e3e3e3"|Record
| align="center" style="border-style: none none solid solid; background: #e3e3e3"|Opponent
| align="center" style="border-style: none none solid solid; background: #e3e3e3"|Type
| align="center" style="border-style: none none solid solid; background: #e3e3e3"|Rounds
| align="center" style="border-style: none none solid solid; background: #e3e3e3"|Date
| align="center" style="border-style: none none solid solid; background: #e3e3e3"|Location
| align="center" style="border-style: none none solid solid; background: #e3e3e3"|Notes
|-align=center
|Loss
|
|align=left| Magomed Abdusalamov
|TKO
|2 
|08/09/2012
|align=left| Olympic Indoor Arena, Moscow, Russia
|align=left|
|-align=center
|Loss
|
|align=left| Artur Szpilka
|UD
|10
|30/06/2012
|align=left| Atlas Arena, Łódź, Poland
|align=left|
|-align=center
|Win
|
|align=left| Livin Castillo
|SD
|8
|31/03/2012
|align=left| Hamilton Manor, Hamilton Township, New Jersey
|align=left|
|-align=center
|Loss
|
|align=left| Harold Sconiers
|MD
|8
|04/02/2012
|align=left| Guilford Convention Center, Greensboro, North Carolina
|align=left|
|-align=center
|Win
|
|align=left| Dennis McKinney
|TKO
|4 
|03/12/2011
|align=left| Greensboro Coliseum, Greensboro, North Carolina
|align=left|
|-align=center
|Loss
|
|align=left| Chris Arreola
|KO
|4 
|11/04/2009
|align=left| Mandalay Bay Resort & Casino, Las Vegas
|align=left|
|-align=center
|Win
|39-9-3
|align=left| Mike Mollo
|UD
|12
|07/11/2008
|align=left| Sichuan Gymnasium, Chengdu, China
|align=left|
|-align=center
|Loss
|38-9-3
|align=left| John Ruiz
|UD
|12
|08/03/2008
|align=left| Plaza de Toros, Cancún, Quintana Roo, Mexico
|align=left|
|-align=center
|Loss
|38-8-3
|align=left| Samuel Peter
|UD
|12
|06/10/2007
|align=left| Madison Square Garden, New York City
|align=left|
|-align=center
|Loss
|38-7-3
|align=left| Nikolai Valuev
|RTD
|3 
|20/01/2007
|align=left| St. Jakob Halle, Basel, Switzerland
|align=left|
|-align=center
|Win
|38-6-3
|align=left| Terry Smith
|UD
|10
|21/07/2006
|align=left| Million Dollar Elm Casino, Tulsa, Oklahoma
|align=left|
|-align=center
|Win
|37-6-3
|align=left| Marcus Rhode
|KO
|2 
|02/06/2006
|align=left| Miccosukee Indian Gaming Resort, Miami, Florida
|align=left|
|-align=center
|Win
|36-6-3
|align=left| Rob Calloway
|UD
|10
|26/04/2006
|align=left| Buffalo Run Casino, Miami, Oklahoma
|align=left|
|-align=center
|Win
|35-6-3
|align=left| Marcus McGee
|UD
|10
|24/03/2006
|align=left| Miccosukee Indian Gaming Resort, Miami, Florida
|align=left|
|-align=center
|Win
|34-6-3
|align=left| Dan Ward
|KO
|1 
|27/01/2006
|align=left| Miccosukee Indian Gaming Resort, Miami, Florida
|align=left|
|-align=center
|Win
|33-6-3
|align=left| Andy Sample
|KO
|1 
|26/11/2005
|align=left| Convention Center, Fort Smith, Arkansas
|align=left|
|-align=center
|Loss
|32-6-3
|align=left| Zuri Lawrence
|UD
|10
|21/10/2005
|align=left| Seminole Hard Rock Hotel and Casino Hollywood, Hollywood, Florida
|align=left|
|-align=center
|Win
|32-5-3
|align=left| Steve Pannell
|KO
|3 
|26/08/2005
|align=left| Seminole Hard Rock Hotel and Casino Hollywood, Hollywood, Florida
|align=left|
|-align=center
|Loss
|31-5-3
|align=left| Calvin Brock
|UD
|10
|23/04/2005
|align=left| Caesars Palace, Las Vegas
|align=left|
|-align=center
|Loss
|31-4-3
|align=left| Chris Byrd
|SD
|12
|13/11/2004
|align=left| Madison Square Garden, New York
|align=left|
|-align=center
|Win
|31-3-3
|align=left| Wayne Llewellyn
|TKO
|1 
|15/04/2004
|align=left| Hammerstein Ballroom, New York
|align=left|
|-align=center
|Win
|30-3-3
|align=left| Cedric Boswell
|TKO
|10 
|03/10/2003
|align=left| Mandalay Bay Resort & Casino, Las Vegas
|align=left|
|-align=center
|Win
|29-3-3
|align=left| Charles Shufford
|TKO
|3 
|09/05/2003
|align=left| Bally's Park Place Hotel Casino, Atlantic City, New Jersey
|align=left|
|-align=center
|Loss
|28-3-3
|align=left| Wladimir Klitschko
|RTD
|10 
|07/12/2002
|align=left| Mandalay Bay Resort & Casino, Las Vegas
|align=left|
|-align=center
|Win
|28-2-3
|align=left| Shannon Briggs
|UD
|10
|27/04/2002
|align=left| Madison Square Garden, New York
|align=left|
|-align=center
|Win
|27-2-3
|align=left| Lance Whitaker
|UD
|12
|01/12/2001
|align=left| Jacob Javits Center, New York
|align=left|
|-align=center
|Win
|26-2-3
|align=left| Michael Grant
|TKO
|1 
|21/07/2001
|align=left| Caesars Palace, Las Vegas
|align=left|
|-align=center
|Win
|25-2-3
|align=left| Alfred Cole
|UD
|10
|25/05/2001
|align=left| Norfolk, Virginia
|align=left|
|-align=center
|Win
|24-2-3
|align=left| King Ipitan
|TKO
|1 
|24/01/2001
|align=left| Las Vegas
|align=left|
|-align=center
|Win
|23-2-3
|align=left| Reynaldo Minus
|UD
|8
|14/09/2000
|align=left| New York
|align=left|
|-align=center
|Win
|22-2-3
|align=left| Sedreck Fields
|UD
|10
|27/07/2000
|align=left| Hammerstein Ballroom, New York
|align=left|
|-align=center
|style="background:#abcdef;"|Draw
|21-2-3
|align=left| Sherman Williams
|PTS
|10
|29/06/2000
|align=left| Hammerstein Ballroom, New York
|align=left|
|-align=center
|Win
|21-2-2
|align=left| Eddie Richardson
|UD
|8
|31/03/2000
|align=left| Hammerstein Ballroom, New York
|align=left|
|-align=center
|style="background:#abcdef;"|Draw
|20-2-2
|align=left| Ron Guerrero
|PTS
|8
|27/01/2000
|align=left| Hammerstein Ballroom, New York
|align=left|
|-align=center
|Win
|20-2-1
|align=left| Jimmy Haynes
|TKO
|3 
|14/09/1999
|align=left| Yonkers Raceway, Yonkers, New York
|align=left|
|-align=center
|Win
|19-2-1
|align=left| Harry Daniels
|PTS
|6
|24/06/1999
|align=left| Atlanta
|align=left|
|-align=center
|Win
|18-2-1
|align=left| Garing Lane
|PTS
|8
|27/03/1999
|align=left| Jai Alai Fronton, Miami, Florida
|align=left|
|-align=center
|Win
|17-2-1
|align=left| Bryant Smith
|SD
|8
|04/12/1998
|align=left| Coliseum, Greensboro, North Carolina
|align=left|
|-align=center
|Win
|16-2-1
|align=left| Mike Dixon
|TKO
|1 
|04/12/1998
|align=left| Virginia Beach, Virginia
|align=left|
|-align=center
|Win
|15-2-1
|align=left| Guy Sonnenberg
|TKO
|5 
|24/09/1998
|align=left| Atlanta
|align=left|
|-align=center
|Win
|14-2-1
|align=left| Kimmuel Odum
|KO
|4 
|27/08/1998
|align=left| Atlanta
|align=left|
|-align=center
|Win
|13-2-1
|align=left| Shane Hykes
|KO
|2 
|30/07/1998
|align=left| Atlanta
|align=left|
|-align=center
|Win
|12-2-1
|align=left| Carlton Davis
|KO
|1 
|25/06/1998
|align=left| Atlanta
|align=left|
|-align=center
|Win
|11-2-1
|align=left| Floyd Womack
|TKO
|2 
|04/04/1998
|align=left| Sons Of Italy, Lake Worth, Florida
|align=left|
|-align=center
|Win
|10-2-1
|align=left| Robert Colay
|TKO
|5 
|21/03/1998
|align=left| National Guard Armory, Charlotte, North Carolina
|align=left|
|-align=center
|Win
|9-2-1
|align=left| Marcus Harden
|UD
|4
|25/02/1998
|align=left| The Ritz, Raleigh, North Carolina
|align=left|
|-align=center
|Win
|8-2-1
|align=left| Frankie Hines
|KO
|1 
|29/01/1998
|align=left| Richmond, Virginia
|align=left|
|-align=center
|Win
|7-2-1
|align=left| Rowyan Wallace
|KO
|2 
|01/11/1997
|align=left| Apollo Theater, New York
|align=left|
|-align=center
|Win
|6-2-1
|align=left| Charles Cue
|PTS
|6
|27/09/1997
|align=left| Shepherd's Gym, West Palm Beach, Florida
|align=left|
|-align=center
|Win
|5-2-1
|align=left| Curt Paige
|PTS
|4
|15/07/1997
|align=left| Riverside Convention Center, Rochester, New York
|align=left|
|-align=center
|Win
|4-2-1
|align=left| Mark Whittaker
|TKO
|3 
|05/05/1997
|align=left| Harrah's Marina Hotel Casin, Atlantic City, New Jersey
|align=left|
|-align=center
|Win
|3-2-1
|align=left| Charlie Brazell
|KO
|1 
|21/08/1996
|align=left| The Ritz, Raleigh, North Carolina
|align=left|
|-align=center
|Loss
|2-2-1
|align=left| Greg Pickrom
|UD
|8
|12/04/1996
|align=left| Fernwood Resort, Bushkill, Pennsylvania
|align=left|
|-align=center
|style="background:#abcdef;"|Draw
|2-1-1
|align=left| Albert Williams
|PTS
|4
|15/03/1996
|align=left| Convention Center, Atlantic City, New Jersey
|align=left|
|-align=center
|Win
|2–1
|align=left| Dwayne Evans
|KO
|1 
|09/02/1996
|align=left| Tropworld Hotel Casino, Atlantic City, New Jersey
|align=left|
|-align=center
|Loss
|1–1
|align=left| Gary Bell
|KO
|1 
|18/11/1995
|align=left| Tropworld Hotel Casino, Atlantic City, New Jersey
|align=left|
|-align=center
|Win
|1–0
|align=left| Brian Nix
|TKO
|1 
|10/10/1995
|align=left| Rochester, New York
|align=left|
|-align=center

References

External links

Living people
1970 births
African-American boxers
American sportspeople in doping cases
Doping cases in boxing
Heavyweight boxers
Boxers from New York City
Sportspeople from Manhattan
American male boxers
21st-century African-American sportspeople
20th-century African-American sportspeople